"Do Not Forsake Me Oh My Darling" is an episode of the allegorical British science fiction TV series, The Prisoner. It was written by Vincent Tilsley and directed by Pat Jackson and was the fourteenth produced. It was the thirteenth episode to be broadcast in the UK on ITV (ATV Midlands and Grampian) on Friday 22 December 1967 and first aired in the United States on CBS on Saturday 3 August 1968.

The episode stars Patrick McGoohan as Number Six and features as Number Two, Clifford Evans.

Produced while Patrick McGoohan was in America filming Ice Station Zebra, the writers worked around McGoohan's absence by having Number Six's mind implanted in the body of another man (Nigel Stock), who is then sent out of the Village to help capture a scientist. As a result, McGoohan appears in the episode for only a couple of minutes.

The episode title, and the background music heard throughout it, derive from the American song "The Ballad of High Noon" – also called  "Do Not Forsake Me, O My Darlin – introduced in the 1952 movie High Noon.

Plot summary
In an atypical teaser before a modification of the standard opening sequence (different music, the usual Number Six/Number Two dialogue is absent), two men sit in the office of a senior intelligence officer named Sir Charles. They are analysing photographic slides by way of seeking clues that will lead them to locate a missing inventor named Professor Seltzman (later revealed to have developed a technology that can switch two people's minds into one another's bodies). They are unsuccessful.

A man referred to only as "Colonel" arrives at the Village and only then learns from a new Number Two that his mission is to trade bodies with Number Six, using Seltzman's system. Number Six had been the last agent to have contact with Seltzman. After the swap, Number Six (now in the Colonel's body, and retaining only his pre-Village memories) awakens in his old London apartment and soon sees an unfamiliar face in his mirror. His fiancée arrives and, of course, fails to recognise him. He prudently restrains himself from enlightening her. Despite the shock, he realises what has been done to him, maintains his cool, and sets about to regain his own body. After a visit to his former superiors (the most senior of them, Sir Charles Portland, previously seen in the teaser) avails him nothing, he attends his fiancée's birthday party. There, he retrieves an old photo lab receipt from her, which he had given her in pre-Village days. He implies his true identity to her and she seems to almost understand, as Sir Charles, her father, had not seemed willing to do. With the retrieved slides back at his flat – they had previously been developed by Sir Charles' minions, and then returned to the shop – he uses an alphanumeric code system based on Seltzman's name to select certain slides which, projected together and viewed with a special filter, reveal the location of Seltzman. This turns out to be (the fictitious) Kandersfeld, Austria, to which Number Six promptly travels. Seltzman is believed – at least by Number Two and his superiors – to have perfected the reversal of the mind swap process. This is exactly what Number Two wanted, and, Number Six having been followed, both men are gassed into unconsciousness and returned to The Village.

The restoration of the identities, however, takes a final unexpected twist: Seltzman agrees to oversee the switchback, but actually does a three-party switch: the body of Number Six gets his mind back, the mind of the Colonel is transferred into the body of Seltzman, who then dies, and Seltzman transfers his own mind into the body of the Colonel, and then leaves on the helicopter before Number Two knows what is happening.

Cast

 Zena Walker . . . Janet Portland
 Clifford Evans . . . Number Two
 Nigel Stock . . . The Colonel
 Angelo Muscat . . . The Butler
 Hugo Schuster . . . Professor Jacob Seltzman
 John Wentworth . . . Sir Charles Portland
 James Bree . . . Villiers
 Lloyd Lamble . . . Stapleton
 Patrick Jordan . . . Danvers
 Lockwood West . . . Camera shop manager
 Fredric Abbott . . . Potter
 Gertan Klauber . . . Cafe waiter
 Henry Longhurst . . . Old guest
 John Nolan . . . Young guest

Original script
The original script for this episode, to be found in volume two of The Prisoner: The Original Scripts, is significantly different from the final version, while working with the same constraint of Patrick McGoohan's limited availability. The beginning is similar, with Number Two meeting the Colonel, here named Oscar, the man whose body Number Six's mind will occupy.

But in this earlier draft of the story, Number Six awakens in his flat in a furious mood, storming to his office to angrily resign. Only at the office does he realise that his appearance is not his own and that a year of his life is missing.

Fearing that this is a ploy to force him to reveal confidential information, Six leaves the office, determined to find "Saltzman" (who became Seltzman in the broadcast version), the inventor of the body-swap machine. Meanwhile, Number Six's former employer, the Colonel, is shown to be in collusion with a mysterious, unseen figure, an apparent agent of the Village. They are collaborating to manipulate Six into locating Saltzman, intending to follow Six as he finds the scientist.

Six returns to his house to find Janet, his fiancée, who doesn't recognise him. Six offers Janet a deal in exchange for locating her missing lover. He later meets her at her birthday party and reclaims from her a receipt for developed photographs held at a camera shop, which Six gave to Janet a year ago. He proceeds to kiss her intimately, in a manner that reminds her of her disappeared lover, and then departs from the party.

Six procures the photographs from the shop, which, overlaid atop each other, produce a map with a set of co-ordinates in Kanderfield, Austria. Six finds Saltzman there, and convinces Saltzman of his identity by referring to their arranged meeting at which Six never arrived. However, Saltzman notices that someone has followed Number Six. It is Potter, a former colleague of Number Six's, sent by their employers to tail Six – and tailing Potter has been an agent of the Village, who gases Saltzman, Six, and Potter unconscious and proceeds to transport the scientist and Number Six back to the Village.

Saltzman is forced to show his captors how to reverse the mind-transfer process, in order to return Number Six and Oscar to their proper bodies. The Village lacked the ability to perform the reversal; that is why they wanted Saltzman. Saltzman says the reversal requires a third party as a "medium" for the transfer, and volunteers himself. Number Two consents, and Six, Oscar and Saltzman are linked to the mind-transfer machine after Saltzman reconfigures it.

The unconscious body of Number Six awakens with the correct mind in place. However, the process has been too much for the elderly Saltzman, who is dying. Oscar is flown out of the Village in the helicopter while Number Six sits by the dying Saltzman's side. Later, Number Two basks in his victory while Six awaits Saltzman's end. But Six reveals that the reversal process never required a third man.

Saltzman then revives briefly, speaking of the orders of Number One, and then dies. Six grimly bids farewell to Saltzman – who is actually Oscar, in Saltzman's body. A horrified Number Two calls the control room, only to learn that the helicopter and Saltzman are out of range.

This original version of the story is more deeply developed in almost all respects. Number Two is portrayed as an arrogant, self-satisfied braggart who boasts to the Butler of being the one Number Two who won't be leaving his position. While the televised version ignores the issue of Number Six's resignation, the original script has Six angrily carrying it out. His interactions with Janet are also slightly different, with Janet being forceful and unwilling to play what she thinks is a game with an employee of her father's.

Absent from the televised version but present here is the treachery of Number Six's superior, the Colonel, speaking to an unidentified 'Voice' who is never seen and is observing the transplanted Number Six's actions. Finally, the script makes inventive use of McGoohan's short time. One scene has Number Two conversing with Oscar-in-Six's-body, who is represented through what the script describes as a single shot of McGoohan. Later, the script has Number Two watching "appropriate stockshots" of Number Six, whose body Oscar occupies, with Number Two commenting that Oscar lacks Six's charm, and when Six awakens restored to his own body, he declares, "I'll tell you nothing! I'm a free man!"

At the end, Six sits with the dying Saltzman before revealing that the reversal process didn't need three men. "Only one could end up free," says Number Six in this brief scene. "It could have been me. But I felt it should be Saltzman. Because I'm going to escape anyway."

This script was apparently rewritten, in the absence of Patrick McGoohan, and after the departure of George Markstein, becoming what was seen onscreen.

Broadcast
The broadcast date of the episode varied in different ITV regions of the UK. The episode was first shown at 7:30pm on Friday 22 December 1967 on ATV Midlands and Grampian Television, on Friday 29 December on Anglia Television, on Thursday 4 January 1968 on Scottish Television, on Sunday 7 January on ATV London, whose broadcasts were also taken up by Southern Television, Westward Television and Tyne-Tees;  on Friday 12 January  on Border Television and on Friday 19 January on Granada Television in the North West. The aggregate viewing figures for the ITV regions that debuted the season in 1967 have been estimated at 7.3 million. In Northern Ireland, the episode did not debut until Saturday 23 March 1968, and in Wales, the episode was not broadcast until Wednesday 25 March 1970.

Notes
 This is one of the few Prisoner episodes to begin with a pre-credits teaser sequence (as well as the recap which opens "Fall Out" and the unusual structure of "Living in Harmony"). It shows several men, including one who will be identified later in the episode as the former superior of Number 6, trying to find clues to the whereabouts of Professor Seltzman in a group of seemingly innocuous photographic slides of Seltzman on holiday. According to The Prisoner by Robert Fairclough, had the serial been renewed for a second series, the format would have followed that presented in this episode, with Number 6 being sent out on missions on behalf of The Village.
 Also missing from the episode is the usual Number Two introductory sequence that follows the opening titles. Instead, Number Six – having woken up – looks out of his window to see the helicopter carrying The Colonel landing. The incidental music is also different in this sequence.
 McGoohan appears only at the very beginning and the very end of the episode, the role of Number 6 (after the mind transfer) being played the rest of the time by Nigel Stock. He also appears in voiceover as Six's internal monologue, and in stock footage from previous episodes. Modern remastered editions also clearly show that the driving sequences in London are actually stock footage of McGoohan. The episode was so formatted in order to allow McGoohan to take a leave of absence from the series to film his role in the motion picture Ice Station Zebra.
 It has been theorised that calling Stock's character "The Colonel" was a misinterpretation of McGoohan's instructions in his absence. In the two other episodes when The Prisoner manages/seems to return to London and contacts his former superiors ("The Chimes of Big Ben" and "Many Happy Returns"), the man in charge is called "The Colonel" (there is a further mention of "The Colonel" among his former associates in "Dance of the Dead"). The suggestion is that McGoohan wanted this to be the case here as well, but returned from Hollywood to find the character called Sir Charles Portland and "Colonel" attached to his own substitute.
 This is the only episode to reference a fiancée, adding an element to Number Six's backstory that is not hinted at in any previous episode (especially relevant to "Many Happy Returns" when Number Six actually escapes from The Village and returns to London) nor any that follow. Indeed, the finale episode, "Fall Out", hints at no significant other. Also the prior episode "Dance of the Dead" states that as far as the outside world is concerned, Number Six is dead. 
 This is also the only Prisoner episode to show Number Six kissing a woman (although he is in another man's body, hence the scene did not involve the devoutly Catholic McGoohan).
 When The Prisoner awakens in his London flat unaware of the body/mind swap, a series of his thoughts, heard via a voice-over recorded by McGoohan, indicates that he believes he is still in the employ of British intelligence and is not considering resigning. Shortly thereafter, his fiancée arrives, and dialogue establishes that it has been one year to the day since he "disappeared." Therefore, his motive for quitting must have been something more than a general matter of principle, even though the very first Number Two, in "Arrival" indicates that to have been Number Six's "story".
 In the scene where Seltzman produces the letter that Number Six had sent him previously, Seltzman's Scottish address starts "Portmeirion Road", named after the location where The Prisoners exterior scenes were filmed.
 The high shots inside the Green Dome showing the screen with Number Six in the mind swap device incorporate obvious doubles for Number Two, The Colonel and Seltzman. The Colonel's double in particular is obvious with his thicker, darker hair. 
 All of the shots of Number Six/The Colonel driving his Lotus Seven around London are stock footage, and clearly show Patrick McGoohan or his driving double behind the wheel. Some of the shots shown are from the opening credits to the series. 
 The reference work The Complete Encyclopedia of Television Programs 1947–1979, by Vincent Terrace, which takes the view that The Prisoner is a continuation of Danger Man, speculates that John Drake resigned from the secret service over the events that led up to this episode, although there is nothing actually indicated on screen to support this interpretation.
The unusual passenger lift with no doors seen in this episode is called a paternoster lift. It uses a chain of open compartments (each usually designed for two persons) that move slowly in a loop up and down inside a building without stopping. Passengers can step on or off at any floor they like.

References

Sources
  – script of episode

External links
 
 BBC Page
 Allmovie

The Prisoner episodes
1967 British television episodes
Fiction about body swapping
Television episodes directed by Pat Jackson

fr:L'Impossible Pardon (Le Prisonnier)